Lyube is a Russian rock band from Lyubertsy, a city in Moscow Oblast. Lyube's music is a mixture of several genres, with influences from both Russian folk music, rock, Russian chanson, and Soviet military songs. The band was founded in 1989, and since then have released sixteen albums. Lyube's producer and main songwriter is Igor Matviyenko.

History

Igor Matviyenko was a music producer and composer working at the Soviet music studio SPM Record when he came up with the idea to start Lyube in 1988. His goal was to put together a band with patriotic themed songs and a strong male vocal. After devoting time to finding the right frontman, Matvienko chose Nikolay Rastorguyev, with whom he had worked earlier in the band "Leysia, pesnia".

Rastorguyev came up with the band's name. "Lyube" has two simultaneous derivations. It is a nickname for the Moscow suburb of Lyubertsy, which is where Rastorguyev lived. It is also a slang word meaning "any" and signifies a diversity of choices or views.

Initially, the band had Aleksandr Nikolayev on bass, Vyacheslav Tereshenok on guitar, Rinat Bakhteev on drums, and Aleksandr Davydov on keyboard, with Rastorguyev as the lead vocalist. Over time, only Rastorguyev remained of the original group. Lyube's first tour took place in 1989, with the band giving concerts in the Russian cities of Pyatigorsk and Zheleznovodsk. These initial concerts were poorly attended. The band's first real break took place in December 1989 when they were invited to perform in a series of concerts sponsored by Alla Pugacheva. Rastorguyev wore an old-style military uniform for the performance. After that, the uniform became a part of the singer's image for many years.

Early 1990s: Debut and Rise to Fame
The band released its first compilation of songs in 1990, titled "We will now live a new way". The same year, the band's membership changed, with Yuriy Ripyakh taking over on drums and Vitaliy Loktev taking over on keyboard. Aleksandr Vaynberg came on board as second guitar. After the release of the compilation, Lyube gained national exposure in Russia, appearing in television programs and being nominated to take place in the prestigious "Song of the Year" competition.

In 1991, Lyube released its first official LP. The debut album was titled "Atas", and included the title song, along with the songs "Pops Makhno", "Taganskaya station", "Don't destroy, you men", and "Lyubertsy". These songs were already well known to Lyube fans from the band's performances in concert, on the radio, and on television. The recording took place at recording studio "Sound" and at a studio of the Moscow Palace of Youth. The album cover featured a photograph of the band members dressed like Red Army soldiers from the days of the Russian Civil War, further building on Rastorguyev's and the band's military styling. The same year, Lyube held a series of concerts at the Moscow sports mega-complex "Olympic" where they unveiled a number of new songs, including "Stop fooling around, America", "Rabbit fur", and "Have mercy, Lord, upon us sinners and save us...".

Lyube filmed their first music video in 1991 in the Russian city of Sochi, using "Stop fooling around, America" as the song. The music video incorporated early CGI and animation elements. In 1994, the music video was submitted to the Midem festival in Cannes and received a special jury prize for "Comedic and visual quality". After its initial success, the band's membership changed again. Evgeniy Nasibulin and Oleg Zenin were added as back-up vocalists. Yuriy Ripyakh was replaced on drums by Aleksandr Erokhin, previously the drummer for the group "Gulyai Poleh". Aleksandr Nikolayev was replaced on bass by Sergey Bashlykov. By this time, the band had built a fan base and developed a large following in Russia.

In 1992, Lyube released its second album, titled "Who said that we lived badly...?". The songs for the album were recorded at the Moscow Palace of Youth and Stas Namin's Studio, and the mastering was completed at studio MSM in Munich, Germany. The album included such hits as "Come, let's play", "Stop fooling around, America", "Rabbit fur", "Tram five", and "Old noble". Around the release of the second album, Aleksandr Vaynberg and Oleg Zenin left the band in order to start their own group called "Nashe Delo".

Mid-1990s: Pinnacle of Success
Lyube's follow-up to their sophomore effort took two years to complete. The new album was titled "Lyube Zone", which was a play on words as the term "zone" has a secondary meaning that refers to a camp for convicts. Some songs on the new album featured Russian folk instruments, including the balalaika, the domra, and the bayan. A number of songs were recorded using teams of back-up vocalists led by Anatoliy Kuleshov, who joined the group in 1994. The recording was done at studios at Mosfilm and the mastering was completed by the German company Audiorent. Upon completing the album, the group decided to combine the music videos based on the album's songs into a feature film. Directed by Dmitry Zolotukhin, the film was produced with the participation of studios Kontakt, Mosfilm, and Gorky. Marina Levtova took on the lead role, while secondary roles were played by a number of known film and stage actors. The film's story was based on seven songs from the new album. Levtova played a reporter who travels to a camp for convicts, where she interviews convicts, guards, and orphans from a nearby orphanage. Each person's story becomes one of the group's songs. The group delayed the release of their third album by more than a year while the film was being completed in order to ensure a simultaneous release of the album and the accompanying film.

With "Lyube Zone", the group diversified its musical output, adding softer songs and rock ballads. The album was a critical and commercial success and won the "Bronze spinner" award as the best domestic release for 1994. As the album was being completed in 1993, band member Vyacheslav Tereshonok died from a drug overdose and was replaced by Sergey Pereguda who earlier was part of such Russian music groups as "Integral" and "Veselye Rebyata".

In 1995, Lyube recorded the song "Kombat". The lyrics were written by Aleksandr Shaganov and the music was created by Igor Matvienko. The song has a military feel to it and chronicles episodes from World War II. The first live performance of Kombat took place in Moscow at a concert celebrating the 50 years anniversary of the Allied victory over Nazi Germany. Kombat became the title song and the first single for the group's next album and was recognized as the "best song of 1995" in Russia. The album Kombat was released in 1996 and, in addition to the title song, contained the songs "Moscow streets", "Demobilization soon", "AWOL", and "There served two friends", all of which featured war-related themes. Fittingly, the album cover depicted a red star atop a military uniform. Most of the songs included on Kombat combined elements of Russian folk music with modern rock, which became a distinctive feature of Lyube's sound.

In May 1996, Lyube played a live television concert as part of unveiling Kombat. Given the military action taking place in Chechnya and the Caucasus in 1996, the war themes of Kombat resonated with Russian audiences. The title song topped the charts and the album received the award for "best album of 1996". That same year, Rastorguyev fulfilled a long time dream by recording and producing an album of Beatles songs that was titled "Four nights in Moscow". By the end of 1996, Lyube was at the height of its popularity despite losing Aleksandr Nikolayev, their long-time bass player, to a car accident. He was replaced by Pavel Usanov.

Late 1990s: Retrospectives, Covers, and Soundtracks
In 1997, Rastorguyev became a "Recognized Artist of the Russian Federation", the second-highest honor for a singer in Russia, awarded by the country's President. In the spring of that year, Lyube released a greatest hits album called "Collected works 1989-1997". In addition to the band's hits, the album also had the new song "Guys from our neighborhood". At the end of 1997, Lyube released its new album, called "Songs about people". In addition to "Guys from our neighborhood", the most popular songs on the new album were "There, past the mists", "Years", and "Starlings". The new album featured more lyrical, slower tempo songs that spoke to human relationships and nostalgia for days gone by.

In early 1998, Lyube took part in a concert celebrating the famous Russian singer Vladimir Vysotsky, where they covered two of Vysotsky's hits: "On soldiers' mass graves" and "Song about stars". Rastorguyev also lent his vocal talent to recording the song "Borders" from the film "Hot spot" and the song "There is only the moment" from the film "The Sannikov Land" for inclusion in the third collection of the series "Old songs about what matters". Lyube also recorded a number of songs for the soundtracks of the films "On a lively place" and "Harness".

In 1999, Lyube celebrated its 10-year anniversary with a Ukraine tour titled "Lyube - 10 years!". That year, the group released a new song titled "Whistle-stops", which would appear on the group's next album.

2000s to the Present
In May 2000, Lyube released their new album and held a major concert at the Sports Complex Olympic in Moscow showcasing both old and new songs and celebrating the band's 10-year anniversary. In addition to "Substations", the new album featured the hit "Soldier", for which Lyube won a Russian Grammy, and also the hit "We'll Bust Through", which became the theme song to the Russian television series "Deadly Force".

In 2001, Lyube played a live concert on Victory Day in Red Square. That same year, Russian president Vladimir Putin, an avowed fan of the band, appointed Rastorguyev to the position of Cultural Advisor to the Russian government. British producers of the documentary film "Russian Army" bought rights from Lyube to use their songs "Demobilization soon" and "Kombat" in the film. Toward the end of the year, Lyube released "Collected works. Volume 2" that included old hits that did not make it into the original "Collected works", along with the new recordings "You carry me, river" and "Song about stars".

In March 2002, Lyube released a new album, titled "Let's drink it for...". The album followed a retro style reflecting the sound of Russian "VIA" bands of the 1960s and 1970s. The band used vintage instruments during recording to approximate the sound of the sixties and seventies as close as possible. Songs on the album included "Birches", "Haymaking", "You carry me, river", "Two girlfriends", "Singing guitar", "It was, it was", and "Grandma". The album stayed near the top of the charts throughout 2002 and subsequently received the "Album of the Year" award from the Russian music recording industry in 2003. In the same period, Rastorguyev was elevated to "National Artist of the Russian Federation" and band members Anatoliy Kuleshov, Vitaliy Loktev, and Aleksandr Erokhin were all awarded the title "Recognized Artist of the Russian Federation".

In 2004, Lyube celebrated their 15-year anniversary by releasing a two-album set. The first album, titled "Guys from our regiment", was released in 2004 and featured the band's earlier hits and new recordings dealing with war-time themes. The second album, titled "Rasseya", featured all new songs, including the title hit "Rasseya" and the song "Don't watch the clock". The album also included a special version of "Through the tall grass", recorded together with members of the Russian special forces from the spetsnaz Alfa group and a rock rendition of the Hymn of the Russian Federation. From its title to its cover art to its song selection, Rasseya featured patriotic themes.

Toward the end of 2006, Lyube released a new single called "Moscow girls" and began work on a new album, which would take them two years. In 2008, while still working on the new album, the band released "Collected works. Volume 3" that included songs from the albums "Atas", "Who said that we lived badly...?", "Lyube Zone", "Kombat", "Songs about people", "Let's do it for...", and "Rasseya". It also featured two new songs: "A hunter's hut" and "My Admiral", recorded for the soundtrack of the Russian film "Admiral".

In 2009, Lyube released the new album they had been working on for the previous two years, titled "Our people". The album featured both previously released hits, such as "A hunter's hut", "If...", "My Admiral", "Moscow girls", and new songs, such as "Verka", "And sunrise", "Calendar", and the title song, "Our people". The new album moved away from war-time and patriotic themes, focusing more on love and relationships. It also featured duets with such popular Russian singers as Grigory Leps, Nikita Mihalkov, and Victoria Dayneko. That same year, Lyube celebrated their 20-year anniversary with a series of live concerts at the Kremlin and an international tour.

On 18 March 2022, Lyube sang at Vladimir Putin's Moscow rally celebrating the annexation of Crimea by the Russian Federation from Ukraine and justifying the 2022 Russian invasion of Ukraine.

At present, the band has five members, still led by Rastorguyev. Lyube has only produced one original song in English, called No More Barricades, which addresses the topic of democracy in Russia.

Current lineup
Nikolay Rastorguyev (vocals, acoustic and electric guitar, 1989–present)
Aleksey Tarasov (backing vocals, 1989–present, keyboards)
Alexander Erokhin (drums, 1991–present)
Alexey Kantur (backing vocals)
Evgeniy Suchkov (backing vocals)
Nearly all songs were composed by Igor Matviyenko (music), Alexander Shaganov (lyrics), and Mikhail Andreyev (lyrics).

Former band members
Rinat Bakhteyev (drums, 1989)
Alexander Davydov (keyboard, 1989)
Yury Ripyah (drums, 1990-1991)
Alexander Vaynberg (bass, guitar, 1990-1992)
Oleg Zenin (backing vocals, 1991-1992)
Vyacheslav Tereshonok (guitar, 1989-1993)
Sergey Grishkov (bass, 1991-1993)
Yevgeny Nasibulin (backing vocals, 1991-1995)
Alexander Nikolayev (bass, 1989-1996)
Yury Rymanov (guitar, 1998-2008)
Anatoly Kuleshov (backing vocals, 1989-2009)
Alexey Khokhlov (guitar, 2000-2010)
Pavel Usanov (bass, 1996–2016)
Vitaliy Loktev (keyboards, accordion, 1991-2022)
Sergey Pereguda (guitar, 1993-2002, 2009-2022)

Notable songs
"Atas" - inspired by the 1979 Soviet TV-miniseries The Meeting Place Cannot Be Changed about criminals in post World War II Moscow, which became a hit and made the band famous in 1991
"Bat'ka Makhno" - meaning "Pops" Makhno, this song about the anarchist Nestor Makhno was made twice, put in three albums
"Ne valyai duraka, Amerika!" - a song that jokes about the Alaska Purchase by the United States
"Kombat" - A tribute to World War II veterans. Commonly mistaken for "one of many songs inspired by Lyube's experiences in Chechnya, where they performed on many occasions, in order to boost the morale of the Russian army".  The Russian word "Kombat" does not mean "combat", but is the standard military abbreviation for "COMmander of BATtalion".
"Soldat" - meaning "Soldier", it carries themes similar to "Kombat".
"Stantsiya Taganskaya" - meaning "Taganskaya" Station, this is a song inspired by the Moscow Metro station of the same name.
"Ty nesi menya reka..." - meaning "You carry me, river...", this was perhaps the most popular of Lyube's many themes written or used for Russian TV series
"Beryozy" - meaning "Birches", this song was the theme to the 2003 TV series Uchastok
"Davay za" - meaning "Let's drink to", this song was the theme to the television miniseries Spetsnaz about the Russian special forces
"Kon'" - meaning "Horse", this song is about wandering around Russian fields on a horse. Incredible explosion of voice at the beginning of the third verse, especially when Igor Matvienko sings 'a cappella'
A rock version of the Russian national anthem.

Discography

Атас (Atas, slang for "alert" — 1991)
Кто сказал, что мы плохо жили..? (Kto skazal, chto my plokho zhili...?, "Who said that we lived badly?" — 1992)
Зона Любэ (Zona lyube, "Lyube zone" — 1994)
Комбат (Kombat, "battalion commander"  — 1996)
Собрание сочинений (Sobranie sochineniy, "collected works" — 1997)
Песни о людях (Pesni o ludyakh, "songs about people" — 1997)
Песни из концертной программы "Песни о людях" 24.02.98 (Iz kontsertnoy programmy "Pesni o ludyakh" ("From the concert programs of 'Songs about people'", two-disc concert recording — 1998)
Полустаночки (Polustanochki, "Whistle-stops" — 2000)
Собрание сочинений. Том 2 (Sobranie sochineniy, Tom 2, "collected works, volume 2" — 2001)
Давай за... (Davay za..., "let's drink it for..." — 2002)
Юбилей. Лучшие песни (Yubilej. Luchshiye Pesni, "anniversary, best of", two-disc concert recording — 2002)
Ребята нашего полка (Rebyata nashego polka, "the guys from our regiment" — 2004)
Рассея (Rasseya, "Russia" with a typically patriotic spelling variation — 2005)
В России (V Rossiyi, "in Russia" — 2007)
Собрание сочинений. Том 3 (Sobranie sochinenyi. Tom 3, "collected works volume 3" — 2008)
Свои (Svoi, "our people" — 2009)
За тебя, Родина-мать! (Za tebya, Rodina-mat' , "For you, Motherland!" - 2015)

References

External links
History of the group
RussMus.Net: Lyube - info, lyrics, tabs and translations
Lyube - lyrics in Russian
News article from Russkaya Gazeta  
Lyube at the Forbes

Russian chanson
Russian rock music groups
Musical groups established in 1989
Anti-Ukrainian sentiment in Russia
Articles containing video clips
Pop-folk music groups
Soviet rock music groups
Winners of the Golden Gramophone Award